Conwal may refer to:

 Conwal and Leck, Catholic parish found in the Diocese of Raphoe, Ireland
 Conwal Cemetery
 Conwal Parish Church (Church of Ireland)
 Saint Conval, Irish-born missionary